Washburn Rural High School is a public high school located in southwest Topeka, Kansas, operated by Auburn–Washburn USD 437, and serves students in grades 9–12. The school is next to Washburn Rural Middle School. In 2007, Edward Raines became the new principal. The "Junior Blue" is the School mascot with the school colors being blue and white. The average annual enrollment is approximately 1,900 students.

Washburn Rural is a member of the Kansas State High School Activities Association and offers a variety of sports programs. Athletic teams compete in the 6A division and are known as the "Junior Blues". Extracurricular activities are also offered in the form of performing arts, school publications, and clubs.

Extracurricular activities
The Junior Blues are classified as a 6A school, the largest classification in Kansas according to the Kansas State High School Activities Association. Throughout its history, Washburn Rural has won 34 state championships in various sports. Many graduates have gone on to participate in collegiate athletics.

Athletics

Football
The football program won the state championship in 1985 and again in 1986 and 1989 under then head coach, Ron Bowen, who has since been inducted into the KSHSAA Hall of Fame. The football stadium at the school, Bowen-Glaze Stadium, is named after coaches Ron Bowen and Ray Glaze. On February 13, 2013, it was announced Steve Buhler would become the head football coach after spending 15 seasons at Rossville High School. Included All league line backer Nathan Gentine of the 2018 season

Men's Rowing
In 2006, the Washburn Rural boy's rowing team was ranked 4th in the state in their inaugural season. The following year they won the 2007 state championship and since have received national recognition. However, there is no longer a rowing program at the school.

Volleyball
In 2009, the Washburn Rural volleyball team was league, sub-state, and state champions. That year, the volleyball team qualified for the state tournament for the thirteenth year in a row, winning the league tournament for the sixth year in a row, the longest such streak in league history.

Cross country

In 2008, Avery Clifton, class of 2010, won the state championship with a time of 14:59.91 seconds in the 4000 meter race, and won again 2009.

In 2010, Jacob Morgan, class of 2012, won the state championship with a time of 15:35.40 seconds in the 5000 meter race. Jacob successfully defended his state title in 2011, with a time of 15:28.50.

Boys' Basketball
The boys' basketball program has also experienced a fair amount of success,  winning state titles in 1966, 1982, 1985 and 2011. The team is currently coached by Kevin Muff.  Clint Mietler who was hired in May 2010 coming from  Douglas High School, and resigned after two seasons. The boys' basketball program has experienced success throughout its history, winning state championships in 1966, 1982, and 1985.The 2010-2011 team captured the school's first league title in 14 years.

Other sports
In 1981, Dana Hazen broke the state record javelin throw at the Kansas Relays. The girls' basketball team has won three titles, occurring in 1996, 1999, and 2009 under the leadership of Bill Annan. In July 2009, Bill Annan joined the Oklahoma State women's basketball team as director of player development, leaving the head coaching position to Kevin Bordewick. The boys' soccer team, under Brian Hensyel, claimed the 6A boys' soccer state championship in a 3–0 win over Lawrence Free State High School. The team finished the season 20–1, and was ranked in several national polls.

State Championships

JROTC
WRHS has an Air Force Junior Reserve Officer Training Corps (AFJROTC) unit.  The KS71ST AFJROTC, was first established at the school in August 1972, and ran through May 1975. The instructors were retired Air Force Lieutenant Colonel Virgil L Burke and Senior Master Sergeant Max Fullerton. In its first year, the admittance of girls were introduced into the program.  The KS71st Boys Drill Team won fourth place at the Richards-Gebaur invitational meet, held at Richards-Gebaur Air Force Base, Kansas City, Missouri.  The second year established the KS71ST Girls Drill Team.  The Boys placed second at the Derby High School Drill Meet, in Wichita, Kansas. The KS71st graduated it first cadets in 1973. The last KS71ST cadets were graduated in May 1975.  Due to the drawdown of United States Air Force forces after Vietnam, and the closure of Forbes Air Force Base, in Topeka, Kansas the unit was discontinued.  A new unit was established in 2013.  The objectives of AFJROTC are to educate and train high school cadets in citizenship, promote community service, instill responsibility, character, and self-discipline, while providing instruction in air and space fundamentals.  Classroom instruction is reinforced by community service, field trips and other training opportunities.  Students participating in AFJROTC are not required to serve in the military and receive physical education and history elective credit for taking AFJROTC courses.  Instructors are retired Air Force Lieutenant Colonel Ron Daniels and Master Sergeant Wayne Long and there are approximately 120 cadets in the program.

Notable alumni
 Ken Berry, former MLB player for the Chicago White Sox, California Angels, Milwaukee Brewers, and Cleveland Indians
 Gregg Binkley, actor
 Aaron Crow, 12th overall pick by the Kansas City Royals in the 2009 MLB Draft, traded to Miami Marlins in 2014
 Branden Dozier, professional football player with the Calgary Stampeders 
 Grant Hinkle, winner of the  2008 World Series of Poker (WSOP) $1,500 No-Limit Hold'em event
 Kris Kobach, Kansas Secretary of State
 Jeff Kready, Broadway actor
 Trey Lewis, former NFL player for the Atlanta Falcons
 Andy Mckee, professional fingerstyle guitarist
 James McClinton, former Mayor of Topeka

See also
 List of high schools in Kansas
 List of unified school districts in Kansas

References

External links
 
 WRHS Alumni Association
 WRHS Hall of Fame
 Clubs and Activities

Public high schools in Kansas
Education in Topeka, Kansas
Schools in Shawnee County, Kansas
Educational institutions established in 1918
1918 establishments in Kansas